The transverse plane (also known as the horizontal plane, axial plane and transaxial plane) is an anatomical plane that divides the body into superior and inferior sections. It is perpendicular to the coronal and sagittal planes.

List of clinically relevant anatomical planes
 Transverse thoracic plane
 Xiphosternal plane (or xiphosternal junction)
 Transpyloric plane
 Subcostal plane
 Umbilical plane (or transumbilical plane)
 Supracristal plane
 Intertubercular plane (or transtubercular plane)
 Interspinous plane

Clinically relevant anatomical planes with associated structures

 The transverse thoracic plane
 Plane through T4 & T5 vertebral junction and sternal angle of Louis.
 Marks the:
 Attachment of costal cartilage of rib 2 at the sternal angle;
 Aortic arch (beginning and end);
 Upper margin of SVC;
 Thoracic duct crossing;
 Tracheal bifurcation;
 Pulmonary trunk bifurcation;
 The xiphosternal plane (a.k.a. xiphosternal junction)
 Anterior, inferior limit of thoracic cavity;
 Marks the:
 Superior surface of the liver;
 Respiratory diaphragm;
 Inferior border of the heart;
 The transpyloric plane
 Plane located halfway between the jugular notch and the upper border of the symphysis pubis;
 Typically located at the lower border of L1;
 Cuts through the pylorus and the tips of the ninth costal cartilages;
 The subcostal plane
 Transverse plane through the inferior border of costal margin;
 Typically located at the superior border of L3, or transects L3;
 The umbilical plane (or transumbilical plane)
 Located at the level of L3/L4 vertebral junction or IV disc;
 The supracristal plane
 Located at the level of L4;
 Marks bifurcation of aorta;
 Most superior aspect of iliac crest;
 The intertubercular plane (a.k.a. Transtubercular plane)
 Located at the level of L5;
 Marks origin of IVC;
 The interspinous plane
 Transverse plane which transverses the anterior superior iliac spines.
 Typically located at the level of S1.

See also
 Anatomical terms of location
 Horizontal plane
 Coronal plane
 Sagittal plane

References

Anatomical planes
Human surface anatomy